Serafim  may refer to:

 Serafim, the Lighthouse Keeper's Son, a Croatian film
 Serafim (given name), a masculine given name

See also

 Serafin (disambiguation)
 Seraphim (disambiguation)